Kanganhal is a village located in Anantnag Tehsil of Anantnag district in Jammu and Kashmir, India.

References

External links

Villages in Anantnag district